The 2013 Eurocup Clio season was the third season of the Renault–supported touring car category, a one-make racing series that is part of the World Series by Renault, the series uses Renault Clio RS 197's.

Race calendar and results
The calendar for the 2013 season was announced on 20 October 2012, the day before the end of the 2012 season. Four rounds formed meetings of the 2013 World Series by Renault season, with additional rounds in support of the Imola round of the Italian Clio Cup, and the Alcañiz round of the International Clio Cup.

Championship standings
 Points are awarded as follows:

Drivers' Championship

References

External links
Website

Eurocup Clio
Eurocup Clio season
Eurocup Clio